Coming Home is the seventh studio album by American country music group Lonestar, released in 2005 on BNA Records. This album produced two singles for them on the Billboard Hot Country Songs charts: "You're Like Coming Home" (No. 8) and "I'll Die Tryin'" (No. 43). Both of these songs were originally recorded by the Canadian country band Emerson Drive on their 2004 album What If?.

Track listing

Personnel

Lonestar 
 Richie McDonald – lead vocals
 Dean Sams – acoustic piano, clavinet, Hammond B3 organ, synthesizers, backing vocals 
 Michael Britt – acoustic guitar, electric guitars, bouzouki
 Keech Rainwater – drums, percussion

Additional musicians 
 Tim Lauer – accordion
 Gordon Mote – acoustic piano, Wurlitzer electric piano, Hammond B3 organ, wah wah clavinet
 Bryan Sutton – acoustic guitar, mandolin
 John Willis – acoustic guitar
 Russ Pahl – electric guitars, dobro, steel guitar
 Bruce Bouton – dobro, steel guitar
 Jonathan Yudkin – mandolin
 Stuart Duncan – fiddle, mandolin
 Aubrey Haynie – fiddle
 Michael Rhodes – bass guitar
 Shannon Forrest – drums
 Chris McHugh – drums
 Robbie Cheuvront – backing vocals
 Sara Evans – backing vocals

Production 
 Justin Niebank – producer, recording, mixing 
 Drew Bollman – engineer, digital editing 
 Scott Kidd – additional engineer 
 Brian David Willis – digital editing 
 Jim DeMain – mastering at Yes Master (Nashville, Tennessee)
 Mike "Frog" Griffith – production coordinator 
 Astrid Herbold May – art direction, design 
 S. Wade Hunt – art direction, design 
 Chapman Baehler – photography 
 Melanie Shelley – grooming 
 Penny Arth – stylist

Charts

References

2005 albums
Lonestar albums
BNA Records albums